Lace is a 1926 German silent crime film directed by Holger-Madsen and starring Olaf Fønss, Elisabeth Pinajeff, and Evelyn Holt.

The film's sets were designed by the art director Alfred Junge.

Cast

References

Bibliography

External links

1926 films
Films of the Weimar Republic
Films directed by Holger-Madsen
German silent feature films
1926 crime films
National Film films
German black-and-white films
German crime films
1920s German films